Akiba's Trip: Undead & Undressed, released as Akiba's Trip 2 in Japan, is a 2013 action-adventure video game for the PlayStation Vita, PlayStation 3, PlayStation 4, and Microsoft Windows by Acquire. It is the sequel to Akiba's Trip on the PlayStation Portable. A third game in the series, Akiba's Trip Festa, has been released in November 2016.

A "Director's Cut" of the game is set to release in Japan in April 2023 for Windows, Nintendo Switch, and PS4.

Gameplay

In Akiba's Trip, the player explores Akihabara and strip the clothes off "Synthisters". There are different things to do such as buy items from shops, enter maid cafes to eat food and play games, or head to the battle arena to train and increase your rank, eventually being about to fight Antoinette. The player character is customizable, with the player able to pick what headgear and clothing to wear, and what walking style and stripping style to use. Character models, voices and skin color are unlocked when beating the game, with some being unlocked when finishing the game with certain endings. Non-playable characters consist of otakus, tourists, maids and more along with "Synthisters" who can be seen with the mobile app Shion developed which is unlocked later in the game. The story is played out as a visual novel where the player gets to choose from three different phrases to say to progress the story. Certain options will increase the player character's affection level with certain characters that will diverge into different endings for the player to experience. A hint system is unlocked when beating the game to ensure that the affection level will increase for the character that the player chooses.

When initiated into battle, the player chooses what weapon to use. The player aims attacks at the lower, middle or upper part of the body to weaken the enemy's clothing, with each body part having their own respective button. There is a combo attack when pressing the attack button repeatedly, a forward attack for moving the analog stick forward while attacking, a strong attack for moving the analog stick back while attacking along with an aerial attack and guard attack. Guarding dodges all attacks but leaves the player character vulnerable to having their clothes stripped but the player can also counter-attack the "Synthister's" attack or if their clothing is flashing, can counter-strip their clothes. When the clothes are flashing, the player can hold the attack button to strip the clothes off but if the clothes are not flashing, they can hold the button and then mash it to force strip it. The more the player strips a certain type of clothing, the more their strip skill will increase, allowing the clothes not to tear so that they can keep the clothing for inventory. If the meter on the top left of the screen is filled and if the player is allied with Shizuku, Touka, Kati, Shion or Nana, they can perform a unison strip, where they do heavy damage to a "Synthister" and cause the other "Synthisters" to be dizzy, stripping them until they are no longer dizzy or the chain strip ends.

Plot

Set in Akihabara, the shopping area has been invaded by creatures known as "Synthisters" who prey on the patrons of Akihabara, feasting on their social energy and will to live. These enemies can only be stopped by direct exposure to sunlight, meaning that the player is required to defeat these synthisters by violently stripping off their clothes and exposing them to sunlight. The storyline revolves around a conspiracy behind the Magaimono organization that the player explores. Within the game, there are over 130 real life Akihabara shops that the player is able to visit.

Characters
 - The main character, an otaku-type high school student, fond of Akihabara. Turned into a Synthister by the Magaimono organization but escaped.
 - The protagonist's childhood friend, and member of the Akihabara neighbourhood watch.
 - A girl with purple braided hair with a mysterious power and a friendly Nighteater.
 - A popular national singing idol. As the game progresses, she is revealed to be Shizuku's sister.
 - The main antagonist of the game. He is also from the same Nighteater clan as Shizuku and Rin. He wishes to turn all of Akihabara into Synthisters.
 - A 26-year-old female CEO of a pharmaceutical company and acquaintance of the protagonist.
 - The protagonist's hikikomori little sister who lives in a room behind the bar at Mogra.
 - A ringleader of Magaimono. He is the first major antagonist introduced.
 - An older twin brother of Yuto.
 - A younger twin brother of Kaito.
 - A Finnish girl who came to study in Japan, because she's fond of anime and JRPGs. She works part-time as a maid in the bar Mogra.
 - An assistant to Shion, later he revealed himself to be a servant of Soga.
 - He is the owner of Mogra, and the leader of Akiba's Freedom Fighters.

Development and release
Development of the game was first announced in Famitsu in August 2013. An official trailer was released on 29 August 2013, introducing the main gameplay concepts, including a feature which allows two characters to strip an enemy's clothes off in unison.

Akiba's Trip: Undead & Undressed has been localised into Chinese and Korean with the assistance of Sony Computer Entertainment Japan. The game features collaboration DLC in the form of character costumes and equippable items, including those from Ragnarok Odyssey Ace, Disgaea, Hyperdimension Neptunia, The Legend of Heroes, Super Sonico, and Genshiken.

XSEED Games localized the game in North America and released it on August 12, 2014, on the PS3 and Vita, with the PS4 version following in late 2014. NIS America released the game in Europe on October 10, 2014. XSEED Games' western localization of the game features original Japanese audio and text, and Japanese advertising for real-life Akihabara locations and products within the original game remains intact. The physical version shipped with dual audio, with the game being stored on a 4GB Vita cart.

Reception

During the first week of release in Japan, Akiba's Trip 2 sold 33,476 PlayStation Vita physical retail copies and 20,230 PlayStation 3 physical retail copies, ranking at fourth and eighth place respectively amongst all software sales that week in Japan. Famitsu gave both the PS3 and Vita versions of the game a review score of 33/40.

Following the game's release in the west, reception among reviewers have been mixed. Crunchyroll noted that the game features a significant amount of content and provides an authentic feel of Akihabara, however does have issues with its combat system. Cinema Blend rated the game 3.5 out of 5, noting it to be a unique game unlike any other game on the market, and Just Push Start gave a score of 9.3, praising the manner in which the setting is presented. Digital Trends. Hardcore Gamer rated the game a 3.5/5 praising the gameplay and amount of content, but criticizing the technical problems and fan-service. They also stated that "Akiba is an open-world game, but it’s hard to fully get lost in it because of how many loading screens you run into when traveling from section to section of the city." Cubed3 gave it 5/10, stating, "Fun characters and a creative concept for combat with an immense amount of character customization are all undermined by the terribly executed and jerky unpolished gameplay." Upon its PC release, HonestGamers praised the game's lampooning of a source material it clearly loved though noted the battle system was "gloriously clumsy", ultimately awarding it 4/5.

References

External links
XSEED Games website
ACQUIRE Corp. site

2013 video games
Action-adventure games
Action role-playing video games
Beat 'em ups
3D beat 'em ups
Nintendo Switch games
Open-world video games
PlayStation 3 games
PlayStation 4 games
PlayStation Vita games
Single-player video games
Video game sequels
Video games developed in Japan
Video games featuring protagonists of selectable gender
Video games set in Japan
Video games set in Tokyo
Video games with alternate endings
Video games with cel-shaded animation
Windows games
Akihabara
PhyreEngine games
Xseed Games games
Acquire (company) games